La Seca is a municipality located in the province of Valladolid, Castile and León, Spain. According to the 2016 census (INE), the municipality has a population of 1,105 inhabitants.

See also
Cuisine of the province of Valladolid

References

Municipalities in the Province of Valladolid